Jeff Bray (19 May 1938 – 24 May 2006) was an Australian rules footballer who played for West Adelaide in the South Australian National Football League and South Melbourne in the Victorian Football League.

Biography
Bray, a solidly built centre half back, won West Adelaide's Best & Fairest award in 1960 and 1963. In the second of those two years he was also 'The Advertiser Player of the Year' and represented South Australia, for one of eight times during his career, to a rare win over rivals Victoria at the Melbourne Cricket Ground (The Croweaters first win over the Big V in Melbourne for 37 years). He was also member of West Adelaide's 1961 premiership team.

He had a three-year stint at South Melbourne in the 1960s but his appearances were restricted through injury.

Bray was an inaugural inductee into the West Adelaide Hall of Fame in 2005. In 2006 Bray died from amyloidosis brought on by heart complications and the following year was inducted into the South Australian Football Hall of Fame.

References

External links

1938 births
2006 deaths
Australian rules footballers from South Australia
Sydney Swans players
West Adelaide Football Club players
South Australian Football Hall of Fame inductees
Deaths from amyloidosis